Kristján Jónsson (born 29 October 1963) is a retired Icelandic football defender.

References

1963 births
Living people
Kristjan Jonsson
Kristjan Jonsson
Kristjan Jonsson
FK Bodø/Glimt players
IF Elfsborg players
Association football defenders
Kristjan Jonsson
Expatriate footballers in Norway
Kristjan Jonsson
Expatriate footballers in Sweden
Kristjan Jonsson
Kristjan Jonsson
Eliteserien players
Allsvenskan players